The sixth elections for Cardiganshire County Council took place in March 1907. They were preceded by the 1904 election and followed by the 1910 election

Overview of the Result
As in previous elections, there was a Liberal majority, with 36 of the elected members being Liberals and 12 Conservatives.

Unopposed Returns

There were a large number of unopposed returns.

Gains and Losses

In turn, however, they lost three seats. At Llanrhystud the previous Conservative member regained the seat he lost three years before while two major landowners won significant victories. The Lord Lieutenant, Herbert Davies-Evans won at Llanddewi Brefi while J.C. Harford of Falcondale narrowly captured Llanwnen.

Contested Elections

contested elections were mostly won by Liberals.

Retiring Aldermen

Eight aldermen retired, all of whom were Liberals apart from Sir Marteine Lloyd. Peter Jones, J.M. Howell, Walter T. Davies and the Rev T. Mason Jones stood in the election but were not re-elected aldermen. Sir Marteine Lloyd, Evan Richards and Rev John  Williams were re-elected without facing the electorate. John Powell stood down.

The New Council

|}

|}

|}

Results

Aberaeron

Aberbanc

Aberporth

Aberystwyth Division 1

Aberystwyth Division 2

Aberystwyth Division 3

Aberystwyth Division 4
Fossett Roberts retained the seat he won at a by-election in 1905, in a contest dominated by accusations about nonconformist ministers' involvement.

Aeron

Borth

Bow Street

Cardigan North

Cardigan South

Cilcennin

Cwmrheidol

Devil's Bridge

Felinfach

Goginan

Lampeter Borough

Llanarth

Llanbadarn Fawr

Llanddewi Brefi

Llandygwydd

Llandysul North

Llandysul South

Llansysiliogogo

Llanfair Clydogau

Llanfarian

Llanfihangel y Creuddyn

Llangoedmor

Llangeitho

Llangrannog

Llanilar

Llanrhystyd
The result reversed the outcome four years previously.

Llanllwchaiarn

Llansantffraed

Llanwnen

Llanwenog

Lledrod

Nantcwnlle

New Quay

Penbryn

Strata Florida

Taliesin

Talybont

Trefeurig

Tregaron

Troedyraur

Ysbyty Ystwyth

Election of Aldermen

Five aldermen who had not faced the election were re-appointed, together with David Evans, who had lost by two votes at Llanwnen to J.C. Harford, another retiring alderman. 
E J. Price, Conservative (retiring councillor at Llansantffraed - did not seek re-election)
Col. J.R. Howell, Conservative (retiring alderman, from outside Council - did not seek election)
Dr David Lloyd, Liberal (retiring alderman, from outside Council - did not seek election)  
D. Evans, Liberal (defeated candidate at Llanwnen)
W.J. Lloyd, Liberal (elected councillor at Nantcwnlle)
James James, Liberal (retiring alderman, from outside Council - did not seek election)
C. M. Williams, Liberal (retiring alderman, from outside Council - did not seek election)
J.T. Morgan, Liberal (retiring alderman, from outside Council - did not seek election)

By-elections

Nantcwnlle by-election
Following the election of W. Jenkin Lloyd as alderman, a Liberal candidate retained the seat.

Notes

References

1907
1907 Welsh local elections
20th century in Ceredigion